The Miles M.14 Magister is a two-seat monoplane basic trainer aircraft designed and built by the British aircraft manufacturer Miles Aircraft. It was affectionately known as the Maggie. It was authorised to perform aerobatics.

The Magister was developed during the 1930s to Specification T.40/36, itself derived from the existing Miles Hawk Trainer which had been ordered in small numbers. The first prototype's maiden flight was on 20 March 1937. It quickly became praised for its handling qualities, increasing the safety and ease of pilot training, while also delivering comparable performance to contemporary monoplane frontline fighters of the era. The Magister was ordered into quantity production.

Entering service barely a year prior to the start of the Second World War, the Magister became a key training aircraft. It was the first monoplane designed as a trainer to be inducted by the Royal Air Force (RAF). During the war it was purchased in large numbers for the RAF, Fleet Air Arm (FAA) and various overseas military operators. It proved an ideal introduction to the Spitfire and Hurricane for new pilots.

During the postwar years, surplus Magisters were exported in large numbers, with many converted for civilian use.

Development

Background
The origins of the Miles Magister can be traced back to a decision made by the company's management in 1936 to further develop its military trainer range; this decision had been influenced by the firm's recent success with the Miles M.2 Hawk Trainer as an elementary trainer, the first low-wing monoplane to be adopted as a trainer by the Royal Air Force (RAF). It was decided to produce a derivative of the Hawk Trainer to satisfy the Air Ministry's Specification T.40/36. The submission ignored an established policy of only procuring metal aircraft which the RAF had instituted at that time.

The new type was broadly similar to the Hawk Trainer: the majority of the differences between the two types pertained to the cockpit, which was enlarged and had numerous new features to better meet military training requirements. On 20 March 1937, the first prototype made its maiden flight, flown by F.G. Miles. During the following month, the aircraft was named Magister. During early flights, the aircraft exhibited an adverse tendency to spin. The alterations worked so well that the Magister became the first low-wing cantilever monoplane to ever be authorised by the Air Ministry to perform aerobatics.

Design
The  Magister is a low wing cantilever monoplane designed for military training. Its design is largely derived from Miles' Hawk Trainer, although there are some noticeable differences, such as the significant enlargement of the cockpit. A more spacious cockpit was required to reasonably accommodate the presence of parachutes and various training aids, which included the provision of blind-flying apparatus. For convenience, the open cockpits are furnished with forward windscreens made of Perspex, while baggage and unused equipment may be stored in a sizable bay aft of the rear cockpit via an exterior door. Pilots are required to enter and exit the aircraft via a wingroot walkway on the starboard side.

The Magister is largely built of wood, the fuselage consisting of a spruce structure with a plywood covering; similar materials were used for the three-piece wing and the tail unit. The wing centre section has no dihedral and is of constant section with outer sections having dihedral and tapering towards the tip. It has split flaps as standard; it was the first RAF trainer to have flaps. It has a fixed tailwheel undercarriage with drag-reducing spats on the main wheels; to reduce the  landing distance, the undercarriage was fitted with Bendix drum brakes. Power is provided by the 130 hp de Havilland Gipsy Major engine and the fuel is contained in a pair of tanks in the centre section.

The flying characteristics and performance of the Magister lent themselves well to the trainer role; according to Brown, the Magister possessed superior performance to any contemporary elementary trainer. It readily enabled trainee pilots to safely learn the handling techniques of modern frontline fighter aircraft. Its ease of handling and safety were attributes that were vigorously demonstrated by Frederick Miles by performing stunts such as hands-free landings and formation flight with other aircraft while inverted. The flight controls are cable-actuated; some of the controls, such as the rudder pedals, can be adjusted to suit the individual pilot.

Into production
Having been impressed by the prototype's performance during trials, the Air Ministry selected the Magister to fulfil the specification. Production began in October 1937. Recognising the importance and value represented by the order, the company committed a significant portion of its manufacturing capacity to producing the type, abandoning its plans to produce other aircraft, such as the Miles Peregrine, to concentrate resources on the mass production effort.

Production of the Magister continued until 1941, by which time 1,203 aircraft had been built by Miles. More than a hundred Magisters were licence built in Turkey. Contemporary glues used to assemble the wooden aircraft have not stood the test of time and few Magisters have survived.

Operational history
Initially, production Magisters were supplied to flying clubs operated by the Straight Corporation, as well as to several overseas government customers. By the Second World War, in excess of 700 Magisters had entered service with RAF Elementary Flying Training Schools; the type would eventually equip 16 such schools as well as the Central Flying School. The bulk of civilian-owned Hawk Majors were also pressed into military service as trainers alongside the type.

During June 1940, as part of British anti-invasion preparations, roughly 15 Magisters were fitted with bomb racks for the carriage of up to eight  bombs, to fly as a light bombers under a scheme called Operation Banquet. The preparations were was never put into effect and the type never saw active combat use in this capacity.

The Magister also participated in experimental wartime research, such as to evaluate a long range ground attack platform during 1941. Seeking to increase the payloads of conventional medium bombers, British military planners suggested the use of a so-called 'auxiliary wing' that could be towed like a glider behind a bomber; this wing would be loaded with either additional fuel or munitions. To test this concept, a modified Magister was produced; by the time testing had reached an advanced stage, the RAF had significantly bolstered its offensive forces with heavy bombers, removing the need to deploy the auxiliary wing concept. Other aircraft received experimental modifications to evaluate new equipment or aerodynamic features.

Following the end of the conflict, large numbers of Magisters were disposed of, leading to many being converted for civilian use. Such aircraft were renamed the Hawk Trainer III. Amongst its civil uses was air racing; during the 1950 Kings Cup Air Race alone, eight Hawk Trainer IIIs were entered, one of which (a modified cabin version G-AKRV), piloted by E. Day, was awarded first place, having achieved a recorded speed of 138.5 mph while doing so. At least two other aircraft were thus modified.

During the postwar years, many Magisters were exported to overseas customers, including private pilot owners and flying clubs. Countries that purchased the type included Argentina, Australia, Belgium, Denmark, Egypt, France, Iceland, Ireland, Italy, Kenya, Lebanon, Morocco, New Zealand, Portugal, South Africa, Thailand and Tunisia.

Variants
Miles M.14 Magister / Hawk Trainer III
 Initial production version.
Miles M.14A Magister I / Hawk Trainer III
Improved variant.
Miles M.14B Magister II / Hawk Trainer II
Improved variant with a  Blackburn Cirrus II engine

Operators

 Royal Australian Air Force  – One aircraft.

Royal Canadian Air Force

 Egyptian Army Air Force
 Royal Egyptian Air Force – 42 aircraft.

 Belgian Air Force – One aircraft operated from 1946 to 1948.

 Estonian Air Force  – One aircraft

 Irish Air Corps  – 27 aircraft  from 1939 to 1952.

 Latvian Aviation Regiment

 Malayan Volunteer Air Force

 Royal New Zealand Air Force – Two aircraft.
 No. 1 Squadron RNZAF
 No. 42 Squadron RNZAF

 Portuguese Air Force  – Ten aircraft.

 South African Air Force

 Turkish Air Force

 Thai Air Force
 Thai Navy

 Fleet Air Arm
 Royal Air Force
 No. 24 Squadron RAF
 No. 81 Squadron RAF
 No. 173 Squadron RAF
 No. 267 Squadron RAF

Surviving aircraft

By 2009, ten Hawk Trainer IIIs were registered in the United Kingdom, of which several were airworthy. Furthermore, several ex-service Magisters have been preserved and on display – including an ex-RAF example at the Imperial War Museum in the UK, and an ex-Irish Air Corps example at the National Museum of Ireland in Dublin.

One Miles Magister was restored and is still airworthy in the Aeroclub of San Martín, Mendoza

ZK-AWY is preserved in the Museum of Transport and Technology New Zealand.

Specifications (Miles M.14A)

See also

References

Citations

Bibliography
 Amos, Peter. Miles Aircraft – The early years. Tonbridge: Air-Britain, 2009. .
 Amos, Peter. Miles Aircraft – The Wartime Years 1939 to 1945. Tonbridge: Air-Britain, 2012. .
 
 
 "Friend or Foe: Two Familiar British Trainers: Tiger Moth and Miles Magister". Flight, Vol. XXXIX, No. 1694, 12 June 1941. p. h.
 Gerdessen, Frederik. "Estonian Air Power 1918 – 1945". Air Enthusiast, No. 18, April – July 1982. pp. 61–76. .
 Green, William and Gerald Pollinger. The Aircraft of the World. London: Macdonald, 1955.
 Jackson, A.J. British Civil Aircraft since 1919, Volume 2. London: Putnam, 1973. .
 Johnson, Graham H.R. "RAF Piston Trainers No. 7: Miles M.14 Magister". Aeroplane Monthly, Vol. 8 No. 3, March 1980. pp. 154–161.
 Lukins, A.H. and D.A. Russell. The Book of Miles Aircraft. Leicester, UK: The Harborough Publishing Company Ltd., 1946.
 MacCarron, Donal. Wings Over Ireland. Leicester: Midland Publishing, 1996. .
 Mondey, David. The Hamlyn Concise Guide to British Aircraft of World War II. Chancellor Press, 1994. .
 Ovčáčík, Michal and Karel Susa. Miles Magister: M.14, M14A, M14B. Prague: Mark I Ltd., 2001. .
 Simpson, Rod The Archive Photographs Series Miles Aircraft Stroud: Chalford Publishing Ltd, 1998.
 Swanborough, Gordon. British Aircraft at War, 1939–1945. East Sussex, UK: HPC Publishing, 1997. .
 Temple, Julian C. Wings over Woodley – The Story of Miles Aircraft & and the Adwest Group Bourne End: Aston Publications, 1987.
 Thetford, Owen. Aircraft of the Royal Air Force 1918–57. London: Putnam, 1957.

External links

 Miles Magister and Miles Hawk Trainer IIIs – British Aircraft of World War II
 Miles Magister Video

Magister
1930s British military trainer aircraft
Single-engined tractor aircraft
Low-wing aircraft
World War II British trainer aircraft
Aircraft first flown in 1937